Jacob Njoku (Hebrew: ג'ייקוב נג'וקו; born 16 November 1997 in Nigeria) is a Nigerian footballer, who plays for Kelantan United in Malaysia Premier League.

References

1997 births
Living people
Nigerian footballers
Beitar Tel Aviv Bat Yam F.C. players
Hapoel Ironi Kiryat Shmona F.C. players
Hapoel Ramat Gan F.C. players
Hapoel Petah Tikva F.C. players
Hapoel Nir Ramat HaSharon F.C. players
FC Dila Gori players
Ceramica Cleopatra FC players
Al Mokawloon Al Arab SC players
Suez SC players
Kelantan United F.C. players
Nigerian expatriate footballers
Expatriate footballers in Israel
Expatriate footballers in Georgia (country)
Expatriate footballers in Egypt
Expatriate footballers in Malaysia
Nigerian expatriate sportspeople in Israel
Nigerian expatriate sportspeople in Georgia (country)
Nigerian expatriate sportspeople in Egypt
Nigerian expatriate sportspeople in Malaysia
Association football forwards